TRN may refer to:
 Taiga Rescue Network
 Talk Radio Network, US radio syndicator
 Terrain Relative Navigation, NASA technology used by Mars landers
 Thalamic reticular nucleus
 The Rail Network, an American television network
 Times Record News, a daily newspaper in Wichita Falls, Texas
 Turin International Airport, Italy, IATA code

See also
 Trn (disambiguation)